Aedes atropalpus, also known by its common name American rock pool mosquito is a species from the subgenus Georgecraigius.  The species was originally described by Daniel William Coquillett in 1902

References

Taxa named by Daniel William Coquillett
Aedes